NAJA Cooperation Bonyad is a Bonyad in Iran, under control of Law Enforcement Command of Islamic Republic of Iran.

References

External links 
Official Website

Law Enforcement Command of Islamic Republic of Iran
Foundations based in Iran